Lawrence Man Hou Ein (born 18 November 1955) is a mathematician who works in algebraic geometry.

Education and career
Lawrence Ein received in 1976 his bachelor's degree from UCLA and in 1981 his Ph.D. from the University of California, Berkeley under the direction of Robin Hartshorne with thesis Stable vector bundles on projective spaces in char p > 0 (which was published in Mathematische Annalen).

For the academic year 1981–1982 he was an American Mathematical Society Postdoctoral Research Fellow at the Institute for Advanced Study. From 1982 to 1984 he was a C.L.E. Moore Instructor at MIT. He became from 1984 to 1987 an assistant professor, from 1987 to 1989 an associate professor, and from 1989 to the present a full professor at the University of Illinois at Chicago. He has been a visiting professor at the University of Hong Kong, UCLA, the University of Michigan, Harvard University, the University of Nancy, and the MSRI in Berkeley.

Ein has served on the editorial boards of the Transactions and Memoirs of the American Mathematical Society from 1995 to 2003, Communications in Algebra from 1995 to the present, Geometriae Dedicata from 2004 to 2013, and Serdica Mathematical Journal from 2004 to the present.

Ein was a Sloan Fellow from 1986 to 1989. He was an Invited Speaker of the ICM in 2006 in Madrid. He was elected a Fellow of the American Mathematical Society in 2012.

Selected publications

with Aaron Bertram and Robert Lazarsfeld: 
with Aaron Bertram and R. Lazarsfeld: 
with R. Lazarsfeld: 
with R. Lazarsfeld: 
with Jean-Pierre Demailly and R. Lazarsfeld: 
with R. Lazarsfeld and Karen E. Smith: 
with Tommaso de Fernex: 
with R. Lazarsfeld: 
with R. Lazarsfeld:

References 

20th-century American mathematicians
21st-century American mathematicians
University of California, Los Angeles alumni
University of California, Berkeley alumni
University of Illinois Chicago faculty
Fellows of the American Mathematical Society
Sloan Research Fellows
Algebraic geometers
1955 births
Living people
Massachusetts Institute of Technology School of Science faculty